Edward Hastings Buckland (20 June 1864 – 10 February 1906) was an English first-class cricketer. Buckland was a right-handed batsman who bowled both right-arm off break and right-arm underarm fast. Buckland played the role of an all rounder.

Buckland was educated at Marlborough College, where he was in the cricket XI. He matriculated at New College, Oxford, where he graduated B.A. in 1886, and played for the university XI. He made his first-class debut for Oxford University against Lancashire.

Buckland spent the vast majority of his first-class career representing the university, where he played 27 matches 1884 to 1887, with his final first-class match for the university coming Cambridge University in 1887. In his 27 matches for the university, Buckland scored 739 runs at a batting average of 17.18, with three half centuries and one century which gave Buckland his career high score of 148 against Surrey in 1887. Further to his role as an all rounder, Buckland took 45 wickets for the university at a bowling average of 20.88, with three five wicket hauls and best figures of 7/17 against the Marylebone Cricket Club in 1884. Buckland was also an impressive fielder, taking 22 catches.

In 1885 Buckland played his only first-class match for the Marylebone Cricket Club against Lancashire. In the same year Buckland made his debut for Middlesex against Yorkshire. From 1885 to 1888 Buckland represented Middlesex in nine first-class matches, with his final first-class match for the county coming against Nottinghamshire in 1888. Buckland scored 254 runs for the club at a batting average of 16.93, with a single half century which gave Buckland his highest score for the county of 51. With the ball Buckland took 27 wickets at a bowling average of 18.51, with one five wicket haul and best figure of 5/15. In the field Buckland took 20 catches.

In late 1886, Buckland toured North America with EJ Sanders' XI where he played in a number of matches, including two first-class matches against Philadelphia Cricket Club at the Germantown Cricket Club Ground.

Following Buckland's final match for Oxford University, as mentioned above, he represented the Gentlemen in two Gentlemen v Players fixtures in 1887. The Gentlemen side was captained by W.G. Grace. The following year Buckland played a single first-class match for CI Thornton's XI against Cambridge University. During the same season Buckland played a single first-class match for Oxford University Past and Present against the touring Australians.

Seven years later, in 1895 Buckland made his debut for Hampshire against Yorkshire. Buckland played four first-class matches for Hampshire in 1895, with his final first-class match coming against Sussex. Buckland scored 116 runs for Hampshire at a batting average of 14.50, with one half century and a highest score of 73. With the ball Buckland took 9 wickets at a bowling average of 23.44, with best figures of 5/30.

In Buckland's overall first-class career he played 48 first-class matches, scoring 1,414 runs at a batting average of 18.12, with six fifties and one century, a score of 148. With the ball, Buckland complemented his ability with the bat by taking 110 wickets at a bowling average of 19.62, with eight five-wicket hauls and taking ten wickets in a match once. Buckland's best figures were 7/17. In the field Buckland took 54 catches.

Buckland never reached the level of international cricket, but was regarded as one of the best all rounders at Oxford. Outside of cricket Buckland was a Master at Winchester College. He was also a keen golfer.

Buckland died at Winchester, Hampshire on 10 February 1906 aged just 41.

Family
Buckland's brother Francis also played first-class cricket for Oxford University, Middlesex and the Marylebone Cricket Club.

References

External links
Edward Buckland at Cricinfo
Edward Buckland at CricketArchive
Matches and detailed statistics for Edward Buckland
Page containing Buckland's Wisden Obituary

1864 births
1906 deaths
People from Laleham
Schoolteachers from Surrey
People educated at Marlborough College
Alumni of New College, Oxford
English cricketers
Oxford University cricketers
Marylebone Cricket Club cricketers
Middlesex cricketers
Gentlemen cricketers
Hampshire cricketers
Gentlemen of England cricketers
C. I. Thornton's XI cricketers
E. J. Sanders' XI cricketers
Oxford University Past and Present cricketers